Takimoto is a Japanese surname. Notable people with the surname include:

Fujiko Takimoto (born 1967), Japanese voice actress
Makoto Takimoto (born 1974), Japanese judoka and mixed martial artist
Miori Takimoto (born 1991), Japanese actress 
Tatsuhiko Takimoto (born 1978), Japanese author

See also
5973 Takimoto, a main-belt asteroid

Japanese-language surnames